Neoclytus angelicus is a species of beetle in the family Cerambycidae. It was described by Van Dyke in 1927.

References

Neoclytus
Beetles described in 1927